Canadian Television Awards are given by several organizations for contributions in various fields of television in Canada. They include national and regional award shows.

General

Gemini Awards

The Gemini Awards were awards given by the Academy of Canadian Cinema & Television to recognize the achievements of Canada's television industry.
First held in 1986 to replace the ACTRA Award, in April 2012, the Academy of Canadian Cinema & Television announced that the Gemini Awards and the Genie Awards would be discontinued and replaced by a new award ceremony dedicated to all forms of Canadian media, including television, film, and digital media.

See also

 List of television awards

References

 
Canadian